Statistics of Bahraini Premier League for the 1991–92 season.

Overview
Muharraq Club won the championship.

References
RSSSF

Bahraini Premier League seasons
Bah
1991–92 in Bahraini football